John Johnson Sr. (September 12, 1770 – July 30, 1824) was a Maryland attorney and judge, and the fourth Chancellor of Maryland, from 1821 to 1824.

Early life
Johnson was born in Annapolis, Maryland, on September 12, 1770.  He was the son of Anne and Robert Johnson, who was said to have been a revolutionary officer. This cannot be positively ascertained.  The incidents of Johnson's early life "seem to be lost in obscurity".

Career
He settled in Annapolis and there practiced his profession. He was appointed Attorney-General of Maryland on October 18, 1806, to succeed John Thomson Mason, his predecessors in that office having also included Luther Martin and William Pinkney. Chief Justice Roger B. Taney, in his Autobiography, mentions John Johnson along with Luther Martin, Philip Barton Key, John Thomson Mason, Arthur Scharff, James Winchester as a leader of the bar when he went to Annapolis to study law in the first decade of the last century. In other places he speaks of him with honor.

He was Attorney-General March 25, 1811, when he was appointed Judge of the Maryland Court of Appeals to fill a vacancy caused by the death of Judge Gantt. Johnson held this position for ten years, where he authored many well-regarded opinions. He was a Presidential Elector in 1816.

Chancellor of Maryland
Upon the death of William Kilty, Johnson was the sole candidate considered for the office of Chancellor of Maryland. He was immediately appointed and accepted. He was appointed to this position on October 15, 1821, but his term was comparatively short and few of his opinions are given in the reports of the Court of Appeals, most of the cases that went up on appeal containing the bare decree of the Chancellor below. He was one of the Boundary Commissioners to settle the dispute between Maryland and Virginia.

Personal life
On January 9, 1794, he married Deborah (née Ghieselen) Johnson (1773–1847), the daughter of Reverdy Ghiselin. Together, they were the parents of:

 Reverdy Johnson (1796–1876), who married Mary Mackall Bowie (1801–1873), the sister of Thomas Fielder Bowie
 John Johnson Jr. (1798–1856) who would become the last Chancellor of Maryland.
 Mary Johnson (b. 1802)
 George Johnson (1817–1892), who married Henrietta E. Harwood (1819–1895)
 William Johnson

He died at Hancock, Maryland on July 30, 1824 of fever while in discharge of his duties in the western part of the State.  At the time of his death, he owned a house in Annapolis and a farm in Prince George's County.  His estate was valued at $4,174, and he owned 10 slaves.

References

1770 births
1824 deaths
Chancellors of Maryland
Judges of the Maryland Court of Appeals